One Heavenly Night is a 1931 American pre-Code film, produced by Samuel Goldwyn, released through United Artists, and directed by George Fitzmaurice.

The plot revolves around a poor-but-honest flower girl who agrees to impersonate an opera star. This film brought Goldwyn his worst reviews and largest financial loss ($300,000) since going independent in 1923. However, the profits from Whoopee! (1930) more than made up the difference.

Cast 
 Evelyn Laye as Lilli
 John Boles as Count Mirko Tibor
 Leon Errol as Otto
 Lilyan Tashman as Fritzi Vajos
 Hugh Cameron as Janos
 Henry Kolker as Prefect of Police
 Marion Lord as Liska
 Henry Victor as Almady, the Officer
 Lionel Belmore as Baron Zagon

References

External links
 
 One Heavenly Night at TCM Database

1931 films
American black-and-white films
Films directed by George Fitzmaurice
Films set in Hungary
Samuel Goldwyn Productions films
American romantic comedy films
1931 romantic comedy films
1930s English-language films
1930s American films